Mehndi is a 2003 Pakistani television series which revolves around the life of four young women, each with her own marital problems.

Plot 
A concerned mother and father (played respectively by Jahanara Hai and Abid Ali) have four young daughters, Malaika (Amna Hussain), Sajjal (Ayesha Khan), Alishba (Aamina Haq) and Laiba (Fiza Ali). The beginning of the drama sees all four marrying their respective husbands on the same day. The rest of the serial showcases their marital lives, the problems they face and the difficulties they must conquer.

Even though theirs is a love marriage, Laiba and her husband, Aahad (Kamran Jillani), have yet to reach the level of understanding that a stable marriage requires. Fights are their general custom from day one, and both must make efforts to cut down their troubles, and live a happy, married life. Adding to their troubles are Aahad's insensitive older sister. Laiba finds herself pregnant, though miscarries soon after, when she falls because of an argument with her sister-in-law. When it becomes apparent that they may never conceive, the couple contemplates adoption.

the eldest daughter Malaika's husband Taha (Adnan Siddiqui) on the other hand, is financially unstable and wants his father-in-law's help to establish himself. he originally worked in the same hospital as Sajjal's husband Shahzeb, but quit as the wedding drew near, as he was insecure about the prospect of being at a lower post after marriage. While he originally, had no intention of asking for his in-laws help, he is spurred on by his visiting brother's wife. Problems spring up for Malaika as his demands grow, and the young woman finds herself trying to balance old home and new home, and a reeling life and world. And in the midst of all this, she is devastated by the revelation that she is adopted, and is actually the child of brother-in-law Rameez's father's deceased cousin. Feeling confused and betrayed, she turns her back from her family, and this puts a further strain on her marriage.

Sister Alishba's problems are altogether even worse: While all three of her sisters have chosen their partners themselves, her marriage is an arranged one. We find that her husband, Rameez (played by heart-throb Aijaz Aslam) was in love with another girl, Ramsha, but was forced by his parents (played by Qazi Wajid and Ayesha Khan) to marry Alishba. Frustration rocks this couple, with Rameez wanting time and again to return to Ramsha, who is bent upon forcing him to divorce Alishba. Alishba, meanwhile, desperately tries to save a marriage that could fail any second, and send her dreams crashing to the ground.

Sajjal's love marriage with cousin Shahzaib (Humayun Saeed) seems to come almost as a relief, as the couple is a mature, highly loving one, with both partners ready to see each other through thick and thin, and Sajjal soon finds herself pregnant. But tragedy strikes, turning their lives topsy-turvy as it is discovered Shahzaib has cancer.

Things wrap up quite nicely in the end, though not without some shocking and touching moments of surprise.

Laiba and Ahad succeed in adopting despite initial protests of Aahad's mother.

Malaika comes to terms with her own adoption, Taha mends realizes his mistakes, and the two make amends with each other, and try to salvage their relationship.

Rameez realizes that he can't in good faith divorce Alishba, and the two resolve to move forward in life.

Sajjal and Shahzaib cherish each other as only two true lovers can, but Sajjal's world is shattered when her husband's deadly disease takes his life. She will, in time, learn to live again, treasuring and holding near and dear the sweet memories of their times together, as she awaits the birth of her child.

Cast 
Aamina Haq as Alishba
Ayesha Khan as Sajjal
Fiza Ali as Laiba 
Amna Hussain as Malaika 
Humayun Saeed as Shahzaib (Sajjal's husband)
Aijaz Aslam as Rameez (Alishba's husband)
Adnan Siddiqui as Taha (Malaika's husband)
Kamran Jillani as Ahad (laiba's husband)
Ayesha Khan as Taseem (Rameez's mother)
Abid Ali as Ali Hassan (daughter's father)
Jahanara Hai as Sauleha Begum (daughter's mother)
Tamanna as Janna Bi (daughter's aunt)
Qazi Wajid as Iqbal (Alishba's father-in-law)

Soundtrack 
Mehndi original song title is sung by Jawad Ahmad.

Awards 
 Lux Style Awards Best TV Play
 Lux Style Awards Best TV  Actor Humayun Saeed
 Lux Style Awards Best TV Actress Aaminah Haq
 Nominated – Lux Style Awards Best TV Actor Abid Ali

References

External links 
 Pakistani Drama

Pakistani drama television series
Urdu-language television shows
Pakistan Television Corporation original programming
2003 Pakistani television series debuts